Baddesley Clinton is a village and civil parish in Warwickshire, England, about  southeast of Solihull. The village has Anglo-Saxon origins. It is believed that at some point it was settled by an Anglo-Saxon called Baeddi, Badde or Bade as a clearing in the Forest of Arden to graze cattle. Such a clearing was called a leah or ley – hence Badde's Ley which became Baddesley. Through most the medieval era, the village was part of Hampton in Arden. In 1290 it passed to the de Clinton family. The de Clintons were a powerful Norman family of the area and held Maxstoke Castle, Brandon Castle and Kenilworth Castle at various times. It was at this point that it became known as Baddesley Clinton. The village is famed for its National Trust property, Baddesley Clinton. The village also has a Grade II listed church dedicated to St Michael, which shares a Rector with St Mary the Virgin's church in the nearby parish of Lapworth.

References

Villages in Warwickshire
Civil parishes in Warwickshire
Warwick District